Alexander John Gervase Chalk,  (born 8 August 1976) is a British politician serving as Minister of State at the Ministry of Defence since October 2022. He has been the Member of Parliament for Cheltenham since 2015. Chalk previously served as the Solicitor General for England and Wales, Minister of State for Prisons and Probation and Parliamentary Under-Secretary of State for Justice. In October 2022, Chalk was appointed Minister of State for Defence Procurement at the Ministry of Defence.

Early life and law career
Chalk was born in Cheltenham on 8 August 1976. He was educated at Windlesham House School and Winchester College before studying Modern History at Magdalen College, Oxford. Chalk's parents are Gilbert John Chalk and Gillian Frances Audrey Blois.

Following graduation, Chalk obtained a Graduate Diploma in Law with distinction from the City University London, and qualified as a barrister from the Inns of Court School of Law. During his legal career, he has prosecuted and defended in cases concerning terrorism, international fraud, and homicide.  He prosecuted three members of a so-called 'Muslim Patrol' who were jailed at the Old Bailey for assault, affray and public order offences. Chalk also prosecuted a group of radical Sunni Muslims who were jailed for attacking a group of Shi'ite Muslims.

Chalk also prosecuted serious fraud cases, including a case against the socialite Edward Davenport, known as Fast Eddie, who was convicted in 2011 of being the ringmaster of a global fraud which saw 51 victims, including Elizabeth Emanuel, the dress designer, pay for "due diligence checks" to secure promised loans totalling £2 billion which never emerged.

Chalk also prosecuted rape and sexual assault cases, including against five men who lured two girls to a house before subjecting them to a weekend of sex attacks. In his opening words to the jury, Chalk, for the prosecution, described men who "acted as they did . . .because they considered the girls essentially worthless and believed they could do with them as they pleased". They were convicted. 

He has also advised and defended corporate clients, and prosecuted for HM Revenue and Customs and the Department of Business, Innovation and Skills. He represented journalists during the phone-hacking scandal. Chalk has provided counsel for the human rights lawyer Nasrin Sotoudeh, an Iranian prisoner of conscience.

Political career
Chalk was first elected as a Conservative councillor for Shepherds Bush Green ward on Hammersmith and Fulham Council in May 2006. He went on to stand successfully in Addison ward in 2010, with Labour taking his former Shepherds Bush Green seat in the same election. He did not stand for re-election in 2014. Whilst on the Council he chaired the Planning Committee for four years.

During his 2015 general election campaign for Cheltenham, Chalk was accused of receiving support from the pro-hunting group Vote-OK, with members volunteering to deliver leaflets for him. In May 2017, Liberal Democrats candidate Martin Horwood said that Chalk was being actively supported by members of pro-hunting organisations Vale of White Horse Hunt, North Cotswold Hunt and Vote-OK, and questioned whether Chalk was concealing his position on fox hunting. Horwood said that when asked to say yes or no to keeping the hunting ban, Chalk replied "free vote" in 2015 but replied "pass" in 2017. Chalk went on to clarify his position during the hustings stating that "This is another misleading and increasingly desperate attack by the Lib Dems, who are seeing their support crater. Contrary to his claims, I have made clear that I would not accept support from any hunt or from Vote OK for the election. That remains my position." Chalk has since clarified his position further stating: "Fox hunting is banned under the Hunting Act 2004, so whether or not an offence is being committed depends on whether or not the behaviour violates its provisions. I have made clear that I would not be in favour of repealing this legislation."

Chalk was among several Conservative candidates from the 2015 general election under investigation for breaking local campaign spending limits. This related to the use of "Battle Buses" during his election campaign, the costs of which were not declared by Chalk's campaign but were instead paid for by the Conservatives' national headquarters. Had the costs been declared the strict local spending limit would have been exceeded by £1,500. Gloucestershire Constabulary confirmed they had received a complaint in 2016 and he was under investigation at the time. Following a lengthy investigation, the Crown Prosecution Service said it would take no further action against any Conservative candidates or party official, including Alex Chalk. In March 2017, the Electoral Commission fined the Conservative Party £70,000 for failing to accurately report campaign spending. In May 2017, The Crown Prosecution Service concluded their investigations into the allegations and determined that no Conservative Party candidates or officials would face charges. An investigation into the Conservative campaign in South Thanet however was to continue.

He was elected as the Member of Parliament (MP) for Cheltenham in the 2015 general election after he achieved a swing of over 10%. His victory in the constituency was the first for a Conservative Party candidate in 23 years.

From June 2015 to January 2019, Chalk was a member of the Justice Select Committee, which scrutinises the government's decisions relating to the justice system. In addition to his role on the Justice Select Committee, Chalk was Chair of the All Party Parliamentary Group (APPG) on Pro Bono and Co- Chair of the APPG on Cycling. He was also the secretary of the APPG on Public Legal Education and the APPG for Highways and the vice chair of the APPG on Lyme Disease.

Chalk held his seat in the 2017 general election with a majority of 2,569.

In 2018, prompted by his concerns about an apparent rise in child and adolescent mental health in his constituency, Chalk led a Parliamentary inquiry, together with the Children's Society and Young Minds charities, into the impact of social media and cyber bullying on young people's mental health. Following the launch of the report, it was referenced in the Government's Response to the Internet Safety Strategy Green Paper (published May 2018).

In 2018, Chalk was appointed Parliamentary Private Secretary (PPS) to the Department of Education. He was then appointed PPS to the Secretary of State for Health and Social Care later in 2018, and then in May 2019 became PPS to the new Secretary of State for Defence Penny Mordaunt.

Ministerial career

Parliamentary Under-Secretary of State at the Ministry of Justice

In February 2020, Chalk was appointed as Parliamentary Under-Secretary of State at the Ministry of Justice.

During the Coronavirus pandemic, Chalk was responsible for mitigating the impact of COVID-19 on the justice system – working to restart the courts system in a safe manner whilst providing ongoing support to the funeral sector, the legal sector and the charitable sector.

Chalk was also responsible for helping to protect victims of crime, and during the COVID-19 crisis, he worked to ensure that victims of domestic abuse could get legal remedies and protections that they needed, including injunctions, non-molestation orders and Domestic Violence Protection Orders.

During the pandemic, Chalk worked with colleagues in the Ministry for Housing, Communities and Local Government and the Home Office, to secure an emergency funding package of £76m for victims, including £28 million to support victims and survivors of domestic abuse and their children. Chalk also signed off measures to provide greater access to legal aid for domestic abuse survivors, with evidence requirements needed to qualify for legal aid expanded to make access easier.

Chalk also authorised the allocation of over £600,000 to boost victims services such as Victim Support, the Survivors' Trust and sexual violence helplines, as well as £3m to support Law Centres which were at risk of collapse.

In June 2020, Chalk took the Divorce, Dissolution and Separation Bill through Parliament which spares divorcing couples from having to apportion blame for the breakdown of their marriage.

In August 2020, Chalk published the “Harm in the Family Courts’ review and accompanying action plan, which seeks to improve how the family courts identify and respond to allegations of domestic abuse and other serious offences, in cases involving disputes between parents about the arrangements for their children.

In December 2020, Chalk took the Private International Law (Implementation of Agreements) Bill through the House of Commons, which provides for the implementation of international agreements on private international law following Brexit.

A video clip of Chalk's exchange on this subject with the Shadow Secretary of State for Justice, David Lammy was widely circulated on social media. During his speech, Chalk pointed out the hypocrisy of Lammy's opposition to the Administration of Justice Act 1920, the Foreign Judgments Act 1933, the Maintenance Orders Act 1972 as all three acts were on the statute book – and even used – under the last Labour government, of which Lammy was a Minister.

In March 2021, Chalk launched the Criminal Legal Aid Independent Review and accelerated criminal legal aid measures, increasing funding by £51m per annum for solicitors and barristers.

In March 2021, Chalk announced measures to protect young people who fall victim to sexual predators working as sports coaches and faith leaders. Alongside his Ministerial colleagues at the Ministry of Justice, Chalk tabled new laws in the Police, Crime, Sentencing and Courts Bill to prohibit those in a position of trust from engaging in sexual activity with a child in their care.

In April 2021, Chalk published the Victims’ Code – which sets out the services and information victims of crime are entitled to from criminal justice agencies – like the police and courts – from the moment they report a crime to the end of the trial.

Chalk was also responsible for progressing the Domestic Abuse Bill through the Commons. This landmark Bill, which received Royal Assent in April 2021, will help transform the response to domestic abuse, helping to prevent offending, protect victims and ensure they have the support they need. For the first time in history, the Bill also included a wide-ranging legal definition of domestic abuse which incorporates a range of abuses beyond physical violence, including emotional, coercive or controlling behaviour, and economic abuse.

Prisons and Probation Minister

In March 2021, Chalk was temporarily appointed as Prisons and Probations Minister whilst his predecessor, Lucy Frazer QC MP, was reappointed as Solicitor General when Suella Braverman MP was designated as a Minister on Leave.

In May 2021, it was reported by The Times that Chalk had told prison officials that they "must stop calling inmates residents, clients or supervised individuals because it creates the wrong impression of criminals". Chalk reportedly told civil servants, prison staff, governors and probation officers that they should stick to using the word prisoner as the increasing use of alternative language to refer to and address prisoners was "sending mixed messages about how the state and wider society perceived serious criminals". Speaking to The Times, a source close to Chalk said "This kind of language does nobody any favours. People in prison are there because they have committed serious crimes and need to be locked up to protect the public. We should be speaking plainly and not pretending that these people are angels residing in a cell out of choice.”

In May 2021, Chalk announced that new prisons will be 'net zero' in future, with the four new prisons being built in England using heat pumps, efficient lighting systems and thousands of solar panels, to reduce energy demand by half and cut carbon emissions by at least 85% compared to prisons already under construction.

In May 2021, Chalk announced that charities and companies which help rehabilitate offenders had been awarded around £200 million of Government funding to provide vital support services that help reduce reoffending, such as employment and housing advice.

In June 2021, Chalk announced that 1,000 new trainee probation officers, a record number for a single year in the history of probation, had been recruited to bolster the vital work the Probation Service does to cut crime and protect the public.

In June 2021, Chalk announced an overhaul to the unpaid work that offenders are ordered to do as part of community service. Chalk announced that the Government would now have more of a say in what unpaid work is spent doing. By working with local councils and police and crime commissioners, Chalk stated that the Government would make even better use of these millions of hours, developing local and visible community payback projects.

In July 2021, Chalk announced a new scheme to provide temporary, basic accommodation to prison leavers for twelve weeks in an attempt to cut crime by reducing the number of prison leavers ending up homeless so that they have the foundation to get a job and access treatment for addictions.

In August 2021, Chalk announced that thousands more solar panels will be fitted to prisons to help cut carbon emissions and to save taxpayers’ money. The installations were expected to cut more than 1,300 tonnes of carbon from the earth's atmosphere and provide 20% of each prison's electricity. It was estimated that this would save £800,000 of taxpayers'money a year.

In August 2021, Chalk announced the expansion of the Clink Kitchens Scheme to a further 25 prisons by the end of the year to help thousands of offenders find jobs and turn their backs on crime.

The programme sees prisoners train in professionally-run prison kitchens for up to 35 hours a week – preparing and cooking thousands of meals daily – while simultaneously working towards professional qualifications which will help them find employment on the outside.

HM Solicitor General for England and Wales

On 16 September 2021, Chalk was appointed as Solicitor General for England and Wales. After his appointment, he became a King's Counsel and was officially sworn in on 23 September 2021.

As Solicitor General, Chalk has sought to ensure that criminals receive custodial sentences that appropriately reflect the nature of their crimes. He has referred a significant number of cases to the Court of Appeal under the unduly lenient sentence scheme, securing enhanced sentences against more than 38 serious offenders in his first eight months in the role. On average, these offenders have been handed down an enhanced sentence that is 56 percent longer than the original sentence they received. These offenders include Milad Rouf, who threw acid in the face of a former partner, James Clarke, who murdered a 39-day old baby, and Christopher Appleby, who sexually abused three girls over a period of 15 years.

In January 2021, a man who had previously been given a suspended sentence having been asked to read improving books was sentenced to an immediate prison term after Chalk personally presented the case on behalf of the Government at the Court of Appeal.

Ben John, aged 22, was in possession of tens of thousands of politically extreme and far-right documents and files, including white nationalist and anti-Semitic materials. He was also found to own a copy of  ‘Anarchists Cookbook’, a widely available book containing instructions for the manufacture of explosives and rudimentary weapons. In August 2021, John was given a suspended sentence. Following Chalk's presentation in court, the Court of Appeal increased John's sentence to 2 years’ imprisonment with a 1 year licence period.

In March 2021, Chay Bowskill saw his sentence for kidnapping, coercive control and perverting the course of justice increased from 7 and a half years to 12 years following Chalk’s decision to refer the case to the Court of Appeal. Bowskill was responsible for the incident which led to Angel Lynn falling from a vehicle moving at high speed in September 2020. Lynn suffered catastrophic injuries as a result of this incident, with severe brain damage rendering her unable to talk, walk and communicate.”

Chalk also referred the sentences to Emma Tustin and Thomas Hughes to the Court of Appeal after they were convicted of murder and manslaughter respectively for their roles in the death of Arthur Labinjo-Hughes.

Arthur Labinjo-Hughes died aged six from unsurvivable brain injuries following years of abuse by Tustin and Hughes. At the time of his death, a medical review found that he was covered in 130 bruises, that he had been poisoned with salt, and that the extent of his injuries amounted to torture. The original sentences handed down to Tustin and Hughes were 29 and 21 years respectively.

As Solicitor General, Chalk oversees the Serious Fraud Office and has sought to ensure that the SFO is effective in tackling fraud, bribery, and corruption. In one case, the SFO secured convictions against Petrofac LTD for bribery, with the energy firm fined £77 million as a result. This is the single largest penalty for a conviction under the Bribery Act since its introduction in 2010.

Chalk has championed a variety of causes during his tenure as Solicitor General. He has been an ardent supporter of the government’s strategy to tackle Violence Against Women and Girls (VAWG).  He has sought to improve the criminal justice to rape, overseeing the implementation of Operation Soteria, a new policy that directs the police and Crown Prosecution Service to focus investigations on suspects rather than complainants’ credibility.

Chalk resigned as Solicitor General on 5 July 2022, citing the Owen Paterson scandal, Partygate and the Chris Pincher scandal.

Parliamentary debates

Chalk has spoken in more debates than the average member of parliament. He has voted the same way as other Conservative MPs on a vast majority of issues. However, Chalk has sometimes differed from his colleagues, such as voting against investigations into the Iraq War, while most Conservative MPs generally voted for. In December 2015, Chalk voted for UK airstrikes against Islamic State of Iraq and the Levant in Syria.

In April 2016, he voted against a plan for Britain to accept 3,000 unaccompanied Syrian child refugees who had travelled to Europe. Following the vote, Chalk published his response to constituents explaining the context of the vote and stated that it was "one of the toughest votes in [his] time in Parliament".
Chalk alongside other MPs, including Richard Graham from the neighbouring Gloucester constituency, tabled a debate in parliament about stalking and sponsored a private member's bill, in order to raise the maximum sentence for stalking from five to ten years. An amendment to the Policing and Crime Act 2017 raised the maximum sentence for stalking to ten years. In announcing the amendment, Justice Minister Sam Gyimah praised Chalk and Graham's role in highlighting the issue.

Political positions

Environmental issues

In early 2018, he launched a ‘Final Straw’ campaign in Cheltenham, which looked to eradicate single-use plastic straws. Chalk welcomed the Government's announcement in May 2019 of plans to ban plastic straws, stirrers and cotton buds by April 2020. In May 2018, he worked with the Marine Conservation Society to host an event in Parliament which featured a bottle deposit return machine. The Secretary of State for the Environment, Food and Rural Affairs, Rt Hon Michael Gove MP, attended and gave his support to the campaign.

Chalk has also spoken out in support of measures to protect animals, such as Lucy's Law. The Law sought to protect puppies by banning third-party puppy farmer sales. Chalk also led a debate on protecting the UK's bee population.

Chalk was selected to sit on the Ivory Bill 2017–2019 Committee to scrutinise the Bill, which sought to ban the commercial use of elephant ivory. Chalk had previously called for the Government to be “bolder and more radical” in this area to crack down on the illegal wildlife trade.

On 30 April 2019, Chalk tabled a Ten Minute Rule Bill seeking to enshrine in law that the UK reaches a net zero carbon account by 2050. Following the presentation of the Bill, Chalk wrote: "Although the UK is currently on course for an 80% reduction (the best performance by any G7 country by the way) the science is clear: if we continue to pump even that remaining 20% of greenhouse gases into the atmosphere, climate change will accelerate. So as I said in Parliament, we in the UK need to play our part in stopping the runaway train of climate change." Chalk's Bill received cross-party support and received Royal Assent in 2019 as the UK became the first major economy to pass laws to end its contribution to global warming by 2050. Other than this, Chalk has consistently voted against climate change prevention measures in Parliament.

Legal Aid

Chalk says he is ardently in favour of reinstating legal aid for early legal advice, believing it to be both fair and cost-effective. He argued that it made sense to address straightforward legal problems before they escalate and end up costing more in the long term. However, he has never voted on the subject.

Cyber Security

One of Chalk's longest-running campaigns is the creation of Cheltenham Cyber Park. Having launched his cyber vision for Cheltenham in 2014, Chalk secured £23 million in Government funding for the Cheltenham Cyber Park to be built near GCHQ. Chalk continues to work closely with Cheltenham Borough Council on the project.

Views on membership of the European Union

Chalk supported remaining within the European Union in the 2016 the United Kingdom European Union membership referendum. He supported the government by voting to trigger Article 50, which formally began the process of Britain's exit from the European Union, along with a majority of cross-party MPs. Chalk described his decision as a way of respecting the referendum result.

Chalk voiced concerns relating to leaving the EU with No Deal but discouraged a People's Vote rally in Cheltenham to fight against a "No Deal Brexit". Chalk consistently argued that the only way to avoid No Deal and to respect the result of the referendum was to vote for a deal. Chalk advocated a "moderate, compromise deal" with cross-party colleagues, but since 2019 has consistently voted in Parliament to support government legislation to leave the EU.

Personal life
Chalk is married with three children and lives in the Charlton Park ward in Charlton Kings, Cheltenham.

References

External links

1976 births
Living people
People educated at Winchester College
Alumni of Magdalen College, Oxford
Alumni of City, University of London
Conservative Party (UK) MPs for English constituencies
UK MPs 2015–2017
UK MPs 2017–2019
UK MPs 2019–present
Politics of Cheltenham
People educated at Windlesham House School
People from Cheltenham
Conservative Party (UK) councillors